Samsung C&T Corporation ("Construction & Trading Corporation"; formerly Samsung Corporation; Korean: 삼성물산), is a South Korean construction and engineering company. It was founded in 1938 as the first Samsung company and was initially involved in construction and overseas trading operations. Since 1995, it has largely focused on global engineering and construction projects, trade and investments, fashion and real estate. The corporation is governed by an 11-member Board of Directors, made up of the President and CEOs of its four working groups (Engineering & Construction, Trading & Investment, Fashion, and Resort), the corporation's CFO, and six independent members. Samsung C&T employs over 17,000 people. The firm is often regarded as the holding company of Samsung chaebol  as it is a major shareholder of various Samsung affiliates.

History 
In 1975, Samsung C&T was designated by the Korean government as the first general trading company to lead overseas sales operations. After the company merged with Samsung Construction in December 1995, Samsung C&T began engaging in global business with offices in more than 50 countries.

In September 2015, Samsung C&T merged with Cheil Industries, a Korean textile firm prominent in the fashion industry that was originally acquired by Samsung Everland in December 2013. The resulting Samsung C&T focuses on fashion, food, housing, leisure, and bio businesses with its Engineering & Construction, Trading & Investment, Fashion and Resort & Construction Groups. The merger has established a third pillar for the Samsung Group, adding to its electronics and financial services.

Engineering & Construction Group
Samsung C&T Engineering & Construction Group specializes in engineering, procurement, and construction.

Building projects 
Engineering & Construction Group of Samsung C&T is best known for its role in skyscraper projects, including the 828-meter Burj Khalifa in Dubai, the Petronas Towers and PNB 118 in Malaysia, and the Saudi Stock Exchange Tadawul Tower in Saudi Arabia. The group is also known for building the Cleveland Clinic in Abu Dhabi, as well as Korea's Incheon International Airport,. Giheung Semiconductor Complex, and Raemian Apartment Complexes.
The construction of the third terminal of Shahjalal International Airport of Dhaka will be done by Aviation Dhaka Consortium (ADC) consisting Mitsubishi Corporation, Fujita Corporation and the Samsung C&T.

Civil projects 
Civil projects by Samsung C&T's Civil Infrastructure Business Unit include construction of roads, bridges, tunnels, ports, subways, and dams. Some of its most notable projects include the Mersey Gateway in the United Kingdom, the Riyadh Metro in Saudi Arabia, and the Busan Newport in South Korea.

Power plants 
Samsung C&T's Plant Business Unit has been involved in the construction of modern power plants—both conventional and nuclear. Its past projects include the UAE Nuclear Power Complex and Emal Power Plant, as well as the LNG Terminal in Singapore.

Trading & Investment Group 
Samsung C&T's Trading & Investment Group focuses on trading industrial commodities such as chemicals, steel, and natural resources, and organizes projects such as Samsung Renewable Energy (a wind/solar power cluster), the Balkhash Thermal Power Plant,

Fashion Group 

In the early years, Fashion Group, formerly Cheil Industries, mainly focused on suit and casual wear with its clothing brands Galaxy and Beanpole. Besides, there was a sportswear brand, Rapido. Fashion Group diversified Beanpole into different lines of children's clothing, outdoor clothing, and accessories. It has also launched new brands in womenswear (KUHO/LeBeige) and in fast fashion (8 Seconds). The Group has been accelerating its entry into the global market, starting with the promotion of the brand Juun.J, which has presented menswear collections at Paris Fashion Week since 2007.

Fashion Group also participates in the development of Korean fashion industry through R&D investment, sponsorship, and fund-raising events. It operates Samsung Fashion Institute and Samsung Design Net, which is a channel to the latest industry news, trend insights, market reports, and research database. In order to support aspiring designers, Fashion Group runs Samsung Fashion Design Fund (SFDF) which selects designers annually.

Resort Group 
Founded in 1963, the Resort & Construction Group has expanded its business scope from land development to resort, golf, food and beverage, energy and landscaping, and construction.

The Group's Everland Resort and high-end golf courses, such as Anyang Country Club and Gapyeong Benest, have been awarded the Innovative Operation for Customer Satisfaction and also received the top enterprise award in the theme park sector by the Korea Standard Association. After fifty years, the Resort Group's value chain extends from construction and energy to landscaping projects. Samsung Welstory, which has grown to become the largest catering service company in Korea since the service began in 1982, has operated as a separate entity since 2013.

References

External links 
Samsung C&T - Official corporate website 
Samsung C&T Newsroom 
Engineering & Construction Group 
Trading & Investment Group 
Fashion Group 
Resort Group 
Samsung Design Net 
Samsung Welstory

 
Construction and civil engineering companies of South Korea
Companies based in Seoul
Construction and civil engineering companies established in 1938
Companies listed on the Korea Exchange
Holding companies established in 1938
1938 establishments in Korea